is a former Japanese rugby union player who played as a flanker. He was named in the Japan squad for the 2007 Rugby World Cup, making 4 appearances in the tournament. He made a further 22 appearances for Japan in his career, scoring five tries, before late coaching Japan Sevens.

References

External links
itsrugby.co.uk profile

1978 births
Living people
Japanese rugby union players
Rugby union props
Munakata Sanix Blues players